A livestock carrier is a large ship used in the live export of sheep, cattle and goats. They are specially built new or converted from container ships.

Livestock carriers
Seagoing vessels modified or purpose-built for the transportation of live animals.

Subject to appropriate regulation, live animals may be transported as part of the cargo on various classes of ship. That particular method of transportation is more common on short sea crossings (e.g. ferries) and usually involves relatively small numbers of animals.
Livestock carriers are those ships, which specialise exclusively in the transportation of large numbers of live animals together with their requirements for the voyage. (food, water, sawdust bedding, medication, etc.).
Voyages on livestock carriers generally last from three days to three or four weeks. Some have lasted for months when disease outbreaks are suspected.

Main sub-types of livestock carriers

Open livestock carriers – in which all, or most, of the animal pens are installed on open decks. In theory, this provides continuous natural ventilation of the pen areas and avoids reliance on mechanical ventilation systems. Ventilation is a key factor in the transport of live animals. When animal pens become poorly ventilated, oxygen depletion and a build-up of toxic gases, develops very rapidly. Circumstances vary according to ambient conditions but a failure of ventilation systems in some tropical conditions can result in asphyxiation of animals in as little as two or three hours.

In practice, natural ventilation alone isn't adequate for all situations. One obvious limiting factor would be in following wind conditions at sea, when the air moves at the same speed as the ship. In that condition the natural air flow ventilating the animal pens can be insufficient. On most open livestock carriers there is also some type of supplementary mechanical ventilation installed in critical zones, along with appropriate back-up equipment for emergencies.

Closed livestock carriers – in which more or less all of the animals pens are located within the holds and internal decks of the ship. This has the advantage of providing a more controlled environment in which the animals and their feeding and watering arrangements are sheltered from adverse weather. However, ventilation is almost entirely dependent on mechanical systems and construction rules require specific ventilation standards for the internal spaces. These usually stipulate the minimum number of air changes per hour. Regulations also require back-up systems and auxiliary power arrangements which are separate from the main engine room. This is to ensure that adequate ventilation, lighting, watering and feeding can be maintained for the animals in the event of fire or machinery failure in the main engine spaces.

Types of animals transported
Various species have been transported in this way, but by far the most numerous are the domesticated breeds of sheep and cattle. During the latter half of the twentieth century, millions of sheep and many thousands of cattle were transported on livestock carriers. Other domesticated species which have been transported, though in smaller numbers, include horses, camels, deer, goats and, on at least one occasion, ostriches.
The transportation of live fish, on small specialised vessels, is a similar trade which has developed in association with fish farming. 

National authorities, which permit the export or import of live animals, regulate and monitor the ships and the associated aspects of the trade very closely, in particular to minimise the likelihood of introducing infectious disease.

Sizes and capacities

This type of ship exists in a variety of sizes, depending on market demands in different parts of the world at different times. In the latter half of the twentieth century, the prime route for such vessels was from Australasia to the Middle East. The principal livestock exporting nations were Australia and New Zealand, with the main importers being nations in the Middle East.

The limiting factors on ship size are complex. Bigger vessels can achieve economies of scale in their operations but also require more extensive port facilities to handle the larger numbers of livestock likely to be loaded or discharged.

Typically, livestock carriers carry more crew members than conventional cargo ships of a similar size, with experienced stockmen an essential part of the crew. The total number of stockmen required depends on the number of animals and also factors such as the arrangement of the livestock pens and the extent of automated systems installed for feeding and watering.

During the last three decades of the twentieth century, there was a progressive trend towards large vessels carrying greater numbers of animals in pursuit of economies of scale. Prior to that, a significant limitation had been fresh water storage capacity on ships; to maintain condition, average-sized cattle require at least forty litres of water per head, per day, with sheep requiring less- at least four litres per head, per day. Developments in water production technology (salt water evaporators or reverse-osmosis systems) have led to livestock carriers with equipment capable of producing up to 600 tonnes (600,000 litres) of fresh water per day. 

Sheep and cattle also require fodder amounting to at least 2% of their body weight per day. Livestock carriers are required to carry sufficient feedstuffs for the maximum length of the voyage, as well as adequate reserves for emergencies.

Medium-sized vessels with capacity for about 30,000 to 40,000 sheep (or 3000 to 4000 head of cattle) are a common size for this type of ship. However, during the last two decades of the twentieth century, there were a small number of sheep carriers which had capacity for 130,000 sheep. 

There were at least two other large livestock carriers which specialised in combined cargoes of cattle and sheep. One had capacity for about 7,000 cattle and 70,000 sheep and the other could carry 14,000 cattle and 20,000 sheep.

In 2007 the livestock carrier Deneb Prima was loading cargoes amounting to 20,000 cattle and 2000 sheep.

The numbers detailed above are only general indications. The space allocated to animals on livestock carriers is officially regulated according to their size and weight ranges. Larger and heavier animals are allocated proportionately more space per head.

Safety record
The DANNY F II capsized in the Mediterranean Sea in December 2009 resulting in the loss of many crew members and more than 20,000 animals.

Fire broke out onboard livestock carrier Estancia (IMO 7404944) anchored off Berbera, in the Gulf of Aden, in August 2013.

In May 2015, the Asia Raya caught fire with 634 cows on board, originally destined for East Kalimantan in Indonesia; many of the cattle lost their lives.

On 12 July 2015, a livestock carrier sunk in the Gulf of Aden, with the death of all the animals onboard and two crew.

Livestock carrier losses in 2015 included the Haidar, in Barcarena, Brazil, in October, carrying 5,000 cattle (an unknown number drowned, and only few survived). Also in the autumn of 2015 the Nabolsi I caught fire in the Mediterranean Sea off Ierapetra, Crete while en route from Beirut to Alexandria. 

In January 2019, the Wardeh was involved in an incident when it ran aground in the Mediterranean Sea near Mersin, Turkey.

In November 2019, the livestock carrier Queen Hind capsized and sank in the Port of Midia, Romania, with 14,000 sheep onboard.

On 2 September 2020, some 6,000 cattle and 41 crew died during the loss of the Gulf Livestock 1 in the East China Sea. Two crew members survived.

In October 2020, livestock carriers were assessed as being twice as likely to be declared an accidental economic loss as other types of cargo vessel. 

On 12 June 2022, some 15,000 sheep drowned in the sinking of the Badr 1 in the Red Sea port of Suakin, Sudan.

See also
Seagoing cowboys: WW2 relief ships

References

External links
Australian Maritime Safety Authority. Marine Orders. Livestock. (AMSA MO 43)
Livestock ship in record voyage with 22000 animals
Campaigns - Naturewatch

Container ships
Ship types
Livestock transportation vehicles